Roger Beatty (January 24, 1933 – April 6, 2020) was an American director, screenwriter and stage manager.

Beatty began his career in 1966, as a stage manager for the television series The Danny Kaye Show. He later stage-managed for The Carol Burnett Show, Insight and The Red Skelton Hour, from 1967. Beatty made his directorial debut in The Carol Burnett Show as an associate director. In 1969, he wrote an sketch for the television series, as becoming a screenwriter for The Carol Burnett Show.

Later in his career, Beatty directed for the television film Of Thee I Sing, with Dave Powers and Dick Hall. He also won and was nominated for Primetime Emmy Awards over the years. In 1988, Beatty retired his career, as last directing for the television series Mama's Family. 

Beatty died in April 2020, after battling with prostate cancer, at his home in Palm Desert, California, at the age of 87.

References

External links 

1933 births
2020 deaths
People from Los Angeles
Deaths from prostate cancer
American television directors
American film directors
American screenwriters
American directors
American male screenwriters
American television writers
American male television writers
Stage managers